Gresford is a village and community in Wrexham County Borough, Wales.

According to the 2001 Census, the population of the community, which also includes the village of Marford, was 5,334, reducing to 5,010 at the 2011 census.

The Grade I listed All Saints' Church, Gresford has been described as the finest parish church in Wales, and has the most surviving medieval stained glass of any Welsh church.  Its bells are one of the traditional Seven Wonders of Wales.

The former Gresford Colliery was the site of the Gresford disaster, one of Britain's worst coal mining disasters, when 266 men died in an underground explosion on 22 September 1934.

History
Located close to the England–Wales border with Cheshire, the settlement existed at the time of the compilation of the Domesday book, when it was recorded as "Gretford" within the Cheshire Hundred of Duddestan; it had a church, though perhaps not on the present site.  The name, derived probably from Old English græs and ford ("grassy ford"), was later recorded as "Gresworth", "Cresford" and "Grefford", but documentary evidence shows that the place was clearly locally referred to as "Gresford" throughout its history, even under Welsh administration, and the other names merely represent alternative spellings. The Welsh form "Gresffordd", supposedly believed to indicate an etymology from y groesffordd ("the crossroads"), seems to have been the imaginative creation of Welsh genealogists of the 15th century and later. This form has, however, seen media use as an alternative spelling since at least the 19th century, and although largely unused by the mainly non-Welsh speakers of the village itself, is today often used by the Welsh press, and Welsh-language media.

In common with many of the towns and villages of the border lands, or Marches, Gresford has gone through periods of both English and Welsh dominance. The whole area was resettled by Welsh aligned to Owain Gwynedd in 1170–1203. At this time the bishopric was transferred from that of St. Werburgh's Chester to St. Asaph, and the vicars of the village were Welsh with patronymic names (for example, Morud ap Gwarius, who became vicar in 1284). 
It is possible, however, that settlement existed on the site from quite an early date, as a Roman altar was found within the church in 1908. The altar is likely to depict Nemesis; this and the unearthing of a Roman coin hoard nearby-dating 150–300, is possible evidence of a settlement. There is also a stand of yew trees in the churchyard, the oldest dating to A.D. 500 — long before Anglo-Saxon settlement.

Approaching Gresford from the Wrexham direction, on the left hand side of the road, there was a tree known as the 'Cross Tree', and alongside this there is the base of an ancient stone cross. This tree was removed after 1984, and has since been replaced with a young tree.

Until the late 19th century, the parish boundary encompassed a large area, including the townships of Burton, Llay, Rossett and Gwersyllt, as well as several townships later included in Isycoed. The bells of the parish church, All Saints' Church are one of the traditional Seven Wonders of Wales. Gresford Church dates to 1492 and is a large building considering the size of what the population would have been in the present day boundaries of the parish. The base of the church tower has earlier remnants of a previous building and an earlier roofline of a former transept can be detected in the tower. The colour of the stone is quite distinctive, and is typical of the Wrexham area. It is a sandy brown Millstone Grit, locally referred to as "Cefn" stone.

Pant Iocyn (later Pant-yr-Ochain) house was built in the 1550s alongside the road from Gresford to Wrexham by Edward Almer, MP and three times High Sheriff of the county. It was one of the chief houses in east Denbighshire and descended in the Almer family until it was bought and enlarged by Sir Foster Cunliffe, 3rd Baronet in 1785. The 18th century addition now serves as a gastro pub.

Gresford Colliery

Henry Dennis and his son, Henry Dyke Dennis, began sinking a coal mine near Gresford in 1888, taking four years for the 3,280 ft deep shafts to be completed. The coalmine was located on the edge of the Alyn Valley, between the Shrewsbury and Chester Railway (later the GWR Birkenhead-Paddington line) and the old main road between Wrexham and Chester. The first coal was produced from June 1911, with full production reached before the outbreak of the First World War. The coal was renowned in the area as being of very good quality and hot burning.

Gresford Colliery was the site of one of Britain's worst coal mining disasters. The Gresford Disaster occurred on 22 September 1934, when 266 men died following an underground explosion. The bodies of only 11 of the miners underground at the time of the explosion were recovered. The headgear wheel is preserved and forms part of the Gresford Disaster Memorial, along with a plaque. The disaster is commemorated in the hymn tune "Gresford", which is also known as "the Miners' Hymn", written by Robert Saint of Hebburn, himself also a miner. This tune has been played regularly by many colliery brass bands over the years and is found on a number of recordings, and is also played at the annual Miners' Picnics around the North of England, especially at the Durham Miners' Gala.

The colliery lasted until 1973 when it was closed due to geological problems.

Transport

The stone-built Gresford (for Llay) Halt, on the Shrewsbury and Chester Railway was midway up the notorious Gresford Bank. The bank was so steep that a refuge siding was required at the station in the event of engines having to leave some of their load behind to get up the hill. Banking engines were also used on occasions. The station was demoted to halt status in 1956 and was closed altogether from 1964.

Education 

All Saints' Voluntary Aided Church in Wales School is the village primary school. It still uses part of the school building constructed in 1874, in memory of  Thomas Vowlier Short, a Christ Church, Oxford University theologian, and former Bishop of St Asaph.

Sport 
Gresford has a football team, Gresford Athletic F.C., which currently competes in the Cymru North. The club was founded in 1946 and plays its home games at Clappers Lane.

Gresford has a cricket club, Gresford Cricket Club, which also plays at Clappers Lane.

See also
 Horsley Hall, Gresford
 East Gresford, New South Wales

References

External links

 Wrexham County Borough Council: Gresford Colliery Disaster
 More on Gresford colliery disaster
 Gresford Athletic
 www.geograph.co.uk: photos of Gresford and surrounding area
 Welsh Coal Mines website: research the history of the local pit
  Gresford Sailing Club

Villages in Wrexham County Borough
Communities in Wrexham County Borough
Mining communities in Wales